Rudziensk or Rudensk is a town in Minsk Region, Belarus. It is located in Pukhavichy Raion. As of 2010, its population was 2,800.

History
Rudensk received the status of "urban-type settlement" (Городской посёлок) in 1938.

Geography
Rudensk is located in south-eastern suburb of Minsk and is circa 50 km far from it, and 20 from Marjina Horka. Its nearest urban-type settlements are Svislach and Pravdinsky. Rudensk counts a railway station on the Minsk-Babruysk-Gomel line.

Sport
Local football club is the FC Rudensk, that in 2010 joined the Belarusian First League. Though the team officially represents the town, its home ground is located in Maryina Horka, the seat and main town of Pukhavichy Raion.

Economic 
Near Rudensk located the Minsk TEC-5 coal powered generating station. Originally the plant was built as the Minsk Nuclear Heat- and Power Plant, consisting of two VVER-1000 reactors. After the disaster at Chernobyl, the plans were cancelled.

Notable residents 

Michaś Čarot (Rudziensk - 1937), Belarusian poet, playwright, novelist, and a victim of Stalin’s purges

Photogallery

References

External links

 
Urban-type settlements in Belarus